Karnare Col is the narrow rocky col of elevation  between the southeast slopes of Mount Craddock and the northeast ridge of Mount Strybing, linking Craddock Massif to Owen Ridge in southern Sentinel Range, Ellsworth Mountains in Antarctica.  It extends  from east to west, with a depression in its eastern part. It is part of the glacial divide between Nimitz Glacier and Rutford Ice Stream, overlooking Severinghaus Glacier to the southwest and Saltzman Glacier to the northeast.

The col is named after the settlement of Karnare in Southern Bulgaria.

Location
The US mapped it in 1961, and updated it in 1988.

Maps
 Vinson Massif.  Scale 1:250 000 topographic map.  Reston, Virginia: US Geological Survey, 1988.
 Antarctic Digital Database (ADD). Scale 1:250000 topographic map of Antarctica. Scientific Committee on Antarctic Research (SCAR). Since 1993, regularly updated.

Notes

References
 Karnare Col. SCAR Composite Antarctic Gazetteer.
 Bulgarian Antarctic Gazetteer. Antarctic Place-names Commission. (details in Bulgarian, basic data in English)

External links
 Karnare Col. Copernix satellite image

Mountain passes of Ellsworth Land
Bulgaria and the Antarctic